Salman Akhtar (born 31 July 1946) is an Indian-American psychoanalyst practicing in the United States. He is an author and Professor of Psychiatry and Human Behavior at Jefferson Medical College in Philadelphia.

Biography
Salman Akhtar was born into a Muslim family in Khairabad, Uttar Pradesh to Jan Nisar Akhtar, a Bollywood film songwriter and Urdu poet, and Safia Akhtar, a teacher and writer. His grandfather, Muztar Khairabadi, was a poet while his great great grandfather, Fazl-e-Haq Khairabadi, was a scholar of Islamic studies and theology and played an important role in the Indian Rebellion of 1857. He is the brother of veteran poet and film lyricist Javed Akhtar and brother-in-law of actress and social activist Shabana Azmi. His son Kabir Akhtar is an American television director and Emmy-nominated editor.

Education and career
After receiving his M.B.B.S. degree at Aligarh Muslim University's Medical School (JNMC) in India, Salman Akhtar did his internship at Maulana Azad Medical College of the University of Delhi in India. He completed post-graduate medical education in psychiatry at PGIMER Chandigarh under renowned Psychiatrist N. N. Wig. During this time, he wrote a famous article "A phenomenological analysis of symptoms in obsessive-compulsive neurosis". He moved to the United States in 1973 and repeated his psychiatric training at the University of Virginia Medical Center in 1976. He obtained psychoanalytic training from the Philadelphia Psychoanalytic Institute in 1986. 

Currently, he is Professor of Psychiatry & Human Behavior at Jefferson Medical College and psychiatrist an at the Jefferson University Hospital as well as a Training and Supervising Analyst at the Psychoanalytic Center of Philadelphia. He has served on the editorial boards of the International Journal of Psychoanalysis and the Journal of the American Psychoanalytic Association. Salman Akhtar has authored, edited, or co-edited more than 300 publications, including 100 academic books. He has also served as the Film Review Editor for the International Journal of Psychoanalysis, and is currently serving as the Book Review Editor for the International Journal of Applied Psychoanalytic Studies. He also has published seven collections of poetry and serves as a Scholar-in-Residence at the Inter-Act Theatre Company in Philadelphia.

Selected publications

 Akhtar, S. (1999). Immigration and Identity. Jason Aronson.
 Akhtar, S. (2007). Listening to Others. Jason Aronson.
 Akhtar, S. (2009). Comprehensive Dictionary of Psychoanalysis. Routledge.
 Akhtar, S. (2012). Psychoanalytic Listening. Routledge. 
 Akhtar, S. (2014). Source of Suffering. Routledge. 
 Akhtar, S. (2021). Tales of Transformation: A Life in Psychotherapy and Psychoanalysis. Phoenix Publishing House.
 Akhtar, S. (2022). In Leaps and Bounds: Psychic Development and its Facilitation in Treatment. Phoenix Publishing House.

References 

1946 births
Indian emigrants to the United States
American psychiatrists
20th-century American poets
Aligarh Muslim University alumni
Scientists from Lucknow
Living people
American people of Indian descent in health professions
American academics of Indian descent
Indian scholars